The 2023 FINA Open Water Tour is scheduled to begin on 20 May 2023 in Sardinia, Italy for the first leg and end in Eilat, Israel on 2 December 2023 for the sixth and final leg. It is the planned 17th edition of the FINA-sanctioned FINA Marathon Swim World Series.

For this 17th edition of the series, FINA implemented a name change from the previous edition, introducing the name FINA Open Water Tour in place of the former name FINA Marathon Swim World Series.

Calendar
The calendar for the 2023 Tour is scheduled by FINA to include six legs.

Medal summary

Men 10 km

Women 10 km

Mixed 4×1500 m relay

Medal table

References

External links
 Official website

FINA Marathon Swim World Series
2023 in swimming
FINA